Smooth soul is a fusion genre of soul music that developed in the early 1970s from soul, funk and pop music in the United States. The fusion genre experienced mainstream success from the time of its development to the late 1970s, before its succession by disco and quiet storm.

Style
Smooth soul is characterized by melodic hooks, funk influence and smooth production style. Allmusic describes smooth soul as "smooth, stylish, and romantic." Unlike pop-soul, which predominantly featured dance-oriented music at the time, smooth soul was more ballad-oriented with generally romantic and seductive lyrical themes. However, its melodic hooks were ideal for crossover play, much like the former. The funk influence of smooth soul's beats also gave the subgenre its distinction from pop.

Popularity
The music enjoyed commercial success during the early to mid-1970s through the works of such artists as Al Green, The Spinners, Marvin Gaye, Harold Melvin & the Blue Notes, Bill Withers, Minnie Riperton, Earth, Wind & Fire and The Stylistics. Well-known works of the smooth soul genre include Let's Get It On (1973), Spinners (1972), Just as I Am (1971) and Let's Stay Together (1972). As pop-soul had metamorphosed into disco during the late 1970s, smooth soul was eventually followed by the development of the quiet storm format.

Notable artists

Ashford & Simpson
The Chi-Lites
Tyrone Davis
The Delfonics
The Dells
Lamont Dozier
The Dramatics
Earth, Wind & Fire
The Emotions
Roberta Flack
The Manhattans
Marvin Gaye
Al Green

The Main Ingredient
Harold Melvin & the Blue Notes
New York City
The O'Jays
Teddy Pendergrass
The Persuaders
Minnie Riperton
The Spinners
The Stylistics
The Whispers
Barry White
Bill Withers
Stevie Wonder
The Isley Brothers
The Commodores

See also
Smooth jazz
Jazz rock
Disco music

References

Soul music genres
1970s in music